Christopher John Malton (born 1 January 1969) is a former English cricketer. Malton was a right-handed batsman who played primarily as a wicketkeeper.

In 1993, Malton played 2 Minor Counties Championship matches for Cambridgeshire against Staffordshire and Suffolk.

Malton made his List-A debut for Huntingdonshire in the 2000 NatWest Trophy against a Hampshire Cricket Board side and also played against a Yorkshire Cricket Board in the 2nd round of the same competition. He played 3 further List-A matches for Huntingdonshire, against Oxfordshire in the 1st round of the 2001 Cheltenham & Gloucester Trophy and a further game against Surrey Cricket Board in the 2nd round of the same competition. His final List-A match for the county came against a Gloucestershire Cricket Board side in the 1st round of the 2002 Cheltenham & Gloucester Trophy, which Huntingdonshire lost.

In his 5 List-A matches, he scored 128 runs at a batting average of 32.00, with a high score of 37.

References

External links
Chris Malton at Cricinfo
Chris Malton at CricketArchive

1969 births
Sportspeople from Peterborough
English cricketers
Cambridgeshire cricketers
Huntingdonshire cricketers
Living people
Wicket-keepers